Gibborim (singular  ) is a Hebrew word that can be glossed 'mightiest', and is an intensive for  ( 'mighty'). In the Hebrew Bible it is used to describe people who are valiant, mighty, or of great stature.

The word  is used in the Tanakh over 150 times and applied to men as well as lions, hunters, soldiers and leaders.

In Modern Hebrew the word  equates with the English word 'hero' (if noun), or 'brave' (if adjective).

Hebrew words and phrases in the Hebrew Bible
Fallen angels
Giants in the Hebrew Bible
Mythological human hybrids
Nephilim